Pierre Asselin may refer to:

 Pierre-Aurèle Asselin (1881–1964), French Canadian furrier and tenor singer
Pierre  Léon Gérard Asselin, former Canadian diplomat